Ib Thermal Power Station (ITPS) is a coal-based thermal power plant located near Jharsuguda town in Jharsuguda district in the Indian state of Odisha. The power plant is operated by the state owned Orissa Power Generation Corporation.

The coal for the plant is sourced from Ib Valley Coalfield. Water is sourced from reservoir of Hirakud Dam.

Capacity
Its installed capacity is of 1740 MW (2x210 + 2x660). 
The commissioning of two more units of capacity 1320 MW (2x660) at the same location was completed in August 2019  to the existing plant for which the Engineering, procurement and construction contract was given to BHEL and BGR Energy Systems Ltd.

The unit wise capacity and other details are as follows.

References

Coal-fired power stations in Odisha
Jharsuguda district
1994 establishments in Orissa
Energy infrastructure completed in 1994